Ferenc Bögi (born 11 April 2002) is a Slovak professional footballer who plays as a midfielder for Fortuna Liga club DAC Dunajská Streda.

Club career

DAC Dunajská Streda
Bögi made his Fortuna Liga debut for DAC Dunajská Streda on 13 March 2022 in a regional derby match against Spartak Trnava at MOL Aréna. After 78 minutes of play, he replaced Sebastian Nebyla, with DAC in a 1–0 lead, following a first half strike by Norbert Balogh. However, in stoppage time Macedonian international Milan Ristovski had scored equalising the final result at 1-1.

References

External links
 
 
 Futbalnet profile 

2002 births
Living people
Place of birth missing (living people)
Association football midfielders
Slovak footballers
Slovakia youth international footballers
FC DAC 1904 Dunajská Streda players
FC ŠTK 1914 Šamorín players
Slovak Super Liga players
2. Liga (Slovakia) players